Qal'eh Dokhtar or Ghale Dokhtar or Dokhtar Castle or Dezh Dokhtar ("The Maiden Castle"), is a castle made by Ardashir I, in present-day Fars, Iran, in 209 AD. It is located on a mountain slope near the Firouzabad-Kavar road.

Name 
The name of the castle implies it was dedicated to the Goddess Anahita, to whom the term "Maiden" refers. After capturing Isfahan and Kerman from the Parthians, Ardashir (re)built the city of Gur near the castle in Pirouzabad, making it his capital.  After defeating Ardavan V (Artabanus V), the Parthian king in a great battle in 224 AD, he built the Palace of Ardashir nearby the Dezh Dokhtar structure. Ardashir's grandfather was a prominent priest of the Goddess Anahita at the nearby temple of Darabgird, "City of Darius."

Location 
The castle is built on a high bluff which overlooks the river and roadway running south from Fars. The entrance to the castle is through a tall gateway within a large, rectangular tower. Inside, a broad stairway leads up to a rectangular hall, with blind niches on either side and two large buttresses at the east end. These supported stairways go up to the next level, with another large rectangular room, 14 x 23 m, with an iwan at the east end and arched blind windows on either side.

Specification 
It was presumably roofed by an arched vault. Beyond this there are steps to a third level and a large rectangular room with ¼ circle squinches at each corner supporting a domed roof. This was buttressed by very thick walls on all sides, presumably to ensure its stability, and the cupola could be reached by a spiral staircase on the south side.

The fortified palace contains many of the recurring features of Sasanian palace and civic architecture: long halls, arches, domes, recessed windows, and stairways. The construction is uniform of roughly shaped stone and mortar, but the surfaces were obviously all finished with a thick coating of plaster or stucco, giving a smooth and elegant appearance, which could have been decorated with ornamentation or painting.

The 1,800-year-old castle has lost some four meters of its original height over the last century and experts warn if urgent measures are not taken to enforce it, the castle may soon collapse.

Gallery

See also
List of Iranian castles
Iranian architecture
Sassanid
 History of Persian domes

References

External links

 

209
Buildings and structures completed in the 3rd century
Gor (Sasanian city)
Castles in Iran
Sasanian castles
Buildings and structures in Fars Province
Tourist attractions in Fars Province
Ardashir I
National works of Iran